Luis Jan Piers Advíncula Castrillón (born 2 March 1990) is a Peruvian professional footballer who plays for Argentine Primera División club Boca Juniors and the Peru national team as a right-back.

A quick and offensive right-back, he can play as a right winger.

Club career

Early career
Advíncula started his career in the lower divisions of Juan Aurich and made his professional debut for the club in 2009. He was transferred in January 2010 to Sporting Cristal, in an effort not only to play international trophies at club level, but also with the intention to earn a spot in the upcoming payrolls.

SC Tavriya
On 17 April 2012, the Houston Dynamo from the United States submitted a bid for Advíncula, but the deal fell apart at the last minute. On 19 July 2012, his move to SC Tavriya Simferopol from Ukraine was confirmed, but he returned to Sporting Cristal after only one month because the club did not meet the quota for Advíncula.

TSG 1899 Hoffenheim
On 5 January 2013, Advíncula signed a four-year contract with German club TSG 1899 Hoffenheim of the Bundesliga.

Loan to Ponte Preta
Advíncula joined brazilian club Ponte Preta on a six-month loan on 10 July 2013, being recommended to the club by manager Paulo César Carpegiani. Although he was expected to be the starting right-back for the Macaca after the departure of Cicinho, the Peruvian player only managed to make four appearances for the club, as he was usually the third-choice on the right side of the defence, behind Artur and Régis. He fell out of favor with manager Jorginho, calling the player "technically weak". He was released from the club on 29 October.

Loan to Vitória de Setúbal
On 19 August 2014, he joined Vitória de Setúbal on a one-year loan.

Rayo Vallecano
On 29 July 2018, Advíncula returned to Europe, this time to La Liga's Rayo Vallecano on loan for one year. A year later, after a good season at Rayo Vallecano, it was said that club had decided to redeem the players buying option, especially after a very well played Copa America with Peru. However, because Rayo was relegated from La Liga in the season he was at the club, it was said that he would be sold from Rayo after they had redeemed him.

After playing play-offs, on 20 June 2021, Rayo was promoted to the first division of La Liga with Advíncula as a substitute

Boca Juniors
In July 2021, Advinicula was transferred to Boca Juniors, after the club reached an agreement with Rayo.

International career
Advíncula has been capped for the U-20 Peruvian national team where he played in the South American U-20 in 2009.

His senior team debut was on 4 September 2010, in a friendly against Canada. His second match was against Jamaica in another friendly match on 7 September of that same year. He was also summoned by coach Sergio Markarian to play the Copa America 2011 in Argentina.

Advíncula also took part in the starting eleven in the second leg of the intercontinental play-off against New Zealand on 15 November 2017. He played a crucial part in the outcome of the 2–0 victory over New Zealand, helping Peru qualify for the 2018 FIFA World Cup, Peru's first World Cup since 1982.

In May 2018, he was named in Peru’s final 23-man squad for the 2018 FIFA World Cup in Russia. He played all three group matches as his side were knocked out of the tournament.

On 9 September 2018, he scored his first international goal in a 1–2 friendly loss to Germany.

On 13 June 2022, after missing a penalty in the decisive World Cup playoff match against Australia as his opponents made the finals he retired from international football aged just 32.

Career statistics

International

Scores and results list Peru's goal tally first, score column indicates score after each Advíncula goal.

Honours
Sporting Cristal
Torneo Descentralizado: 2012, 2014

Boca Juniors
Primera División: 2022
Copa Argentina: 2019–20
Copa de la Liga Profesional: 2022
Supercopa Argentina: 2022

References

External links

Luis Advíncula at Lobos BUAP Profile

1990 births
Living people
People from Ica, Peru
Peruvian footballers
Peru international footballers
Peruvian expatriate footballers
Peruvian Primera División players
Juan Aurich footballers
Sporting Cristal footballers
SC Tavriya Simferopol players
TSG 1899 Hoffenheim players
Associação Atlética Ponte Preta players
Vitória F.C. players
Bursaspor footballers
Newell's Old Boys footballers
Tigres UANL footballers
Rayo Vallecano players
Boca Juniors footballers
Association football fullbacks
Association football wingers
Association football utility players
2011 Copa América players
2015 Copa América players
Bundesliga players
Campeonato Brasileiro Série A players
Primeira Liga players
Liga MX players
La Liga players
Segunda División players
Expatriate footballers in Ukraine
Expatriate footballers in Germany
Expatriate footballers in Brazil
Expatriate footballers in Portugal
Expatriate footballers in Turkey
Expatriate footballers in Argentina
Expatriate footballers in Mexico
Expatriate footballers in Spain
Peruvian expatriate sportspeople in Ukraine
Peruvian expatriate sportspeople in Germany
Peruvian expatriate sportspeople in Brazil
Peruvian expatriate sportspeople in Portugal
Peruvian expatriate sportspeople in Turkey
Peruvian expatriate sportspeople in Argentina
Peruvian expatriate sportspeople in Mexico
Peruvian expatriate sportspeople in Spain
2018 FIFA World Cup players
2019 Copa América players
FIFA Century Club